Ardabur served as magister militum in the East Roman army in the 420s, under Theodosius II. He was of Alanic origin.

During the Roman-Persian War of 421–422, he ravaged Arzanene and besieged Nisibis. After the war ended, Ardabur was promoted to the rank of magister militum praesentalis.

In 424, Ardabur and his son Aspar were sent on a campaign to Italy to overthrow the usurper Joannes. Ardabur was captured but his son managed to save him.

After his return to Constantinople, he was made consul for the year 427.

Ardabur should be distinguished from his grandson of the same name, who was consul twenty years later.

References

Sources
 
 
 

5th-century Romans
5th-century Roman consuls
Alanic people
Imperial Roman consuls
Magistri militum
People of the Roman–Sasanian Wars
Roman prisoners of war